The Dundalk Eagle is a newspaper serving Dundalk, Maryland.  Founded in 1969 by Kimbel E. Oelke, it was one of the biggest family-owned weekly newspapers in Maryland before its acquisition by Adams Publishing Group in 2015.

References

External links
 Official Website

Newspapers published in Maryland